Mad Love is the lead single from Black and White Rainbows, the seventh studio album by British rock band Bush. It was released on 6 February 2017.

Music video
The video for Mad Love featured Bush performing the song on a rooftop of a building. There are also shots of Gavin Rossdale in a well-worn red room while belting out lyrics.

Performances
Bush performed Mad Love live on The Voice UK, a British television talent show on which Gavin Rossdale served as a coach.

Chart

References

2017 singles
Bush (British band) songs
2017 songs
Songs written by Gavin Rossdale